The 2012 President's Cup was the 62nd season of the President's Cup, a knock-out competition for Maldives' top 4 football clubs. Victory Sports Club were the defending champions, having beaten New Radiant Sports Club 2–1 in last season's Final.

The winner of the competition will qualify for the qualifying play-off of the 2013 AFC Cup. The final was held on the 15 October 2012, and was contested at Rasmee Dhandu Stadium between the same finalists of the previous season, New Radiant and Victory. New Radiant won the final 2-1 on penalties, claiming a record ninth President's Cup, after the score was 0-0 after extra time.

The broadcasting rights for all the matches of 2012 Maldives President's Cup were given to the Television Maldives.

Final qualifier

Semi-final qualifier

Semi-final

Final

The final was played on 15 October 2012 at Rasmee Dhandu Stadium. The final involved one team from the Dhivehi League, New Radiant and Victory. The game was won by New Radiant after a penalty shoot-out.

Statistics

Scorers

Assists

Own goals
  Rilwan Waheed (Victory) (playing against Maziya)

References

President's Cup (Maldives)
Pres